Jacob Boelen (c. 1657 – April 4, 1729) was an early American silversmith, active in New York City. He was father to silversmith Henricus Boelen.

Boelen was born in Amsterdam, and brought to New York with his family in 1659. In 1676 he was admitted to the Dutch Church, and married Katharina Klock on May 21, 1679. He became a freeman in 1698, and served as alderman of the North Ward from 1695-1701. In 1702 he also served as a juror in the trial of Colonel Nicholas Bayard for high treason. His works are collected in the Metropolitan Museum of Art, Winterthur Museum, and Yale University Art Gallery.

References 
 Jacob Boelen: Goldsmith of New York and His Family Circle, Howard Stelle Fitz Randolph, New York Genealogical and Biographical Scociety, 1941.
 American Silversmiths and Their Marks: The Definitive (1948) Edition, Stephen G. C. Ensko, Courier Corporation, 2012, page 25.
 American silver at Winterthur, Ian M. G. Quimby, Dianne Johnson, Henry Francis du Pont Winterthur Museum, 1995, page 199.
 A Complete Collection of State Trials and Proceedings for High Treason and Other Crimes and Misdemeanors from the Earliest Period to the Year 1820. (etc.), Thomas Bayly Howell, Longman, 1816, pages 472-482.
 "Jacob Boelen", Grove Art Online.
 "Jacob Boelen", American Silversmiths.

American silversmiths